Boustead Hill is a hamlet in Cumbria, England. It has two separate equestrian centres. In 1831 the township had a population of 63.

It is located close to the site where the famous Solway Firth Spaceman photograph was taken.

See also

Listed buildings in Burgh by Sands

References

Hamlets in Cumbria
Burgh by Sands